Nadrichne is a village in Ternopil Raion of Ternopil Oblast. It belongs to Berezhany urban hromada, one of the hromadas of Ukraine.

Until 18 July 2020, Nadrichne belonged to Berezhany Raion. The raion was abolished in July 2020 as part of the administrative reform of Ukraine, which reduced the number of raions of Ternopil Oblast to three. The area of Berezhany Raion was merged into Ternopil Raion.

References

Villages in Ternopil Raion